Banaripara is an Upazila of Barishal District in the Division of Barishal in southern-central Bangladesh.

History
During the Liberation War in 1971, the Pakistani army killed many innocent people of village Gava where all Ghosh Dastidar and Ghosh Ray used to live and they mostly left their ancestral land for good.

Geography
It has 26,697 households and a total area of 134.32 km2. It is surrounded by Wazirpur to the north and the east, Nesarabad to the south, Jhalokati to the east, Nazirpur to the west. The upazila is criss-crossed by many rivers. Banaripara pourashava stands on the Shandhya. River erosion is a matter of concern for this area.

Demographics
According to the 1991 Bangladesh census, Banaripara had a population of 143,825. Males constituted 50.67% of the population, and females 49.33%. The population aged 18 or over was 70,724.

Administration
Banaripara was established as a thana in 1913 and in 1983 it was upgraded as an upazila. 

Banaripara Upazila is divided into Banaripara Municipality and eight union parishads: Baisari, Banaripara, Bisarkandi, Chakhar, Iluhar, Saliabakpur, Saidkati, and Udaykati. The union parishads are subdivided into 76 mauzas and 76 villages.

Archaeological heritage and relics
There are two Swathidaha Maths, a copper Manasa Bigraga weighing 3.5 maunds and a six-foot-high Bigraha at Narattampur (200 years old) which used to be family lineage of the Ghosh Ray family of Narratampur.

Education

There are three colleges in the upazila. Government Fazlul Huq College, founded in 1940, is the only public one.

There are 27 high schools, 80 government primary schools, 41 non-government primary schools, 59 madrassas, 1 school for the deaf and dumb and 1 commercial school in this upazila.

According to Banglapedia, Baisari High School, founded in 1880, Govt. Banaripara Model Union Institution (Pilot), (1889), and Nalasree Government Primary School (1910) are notable schools.

Notable people
Syed Azizul Huq, former Education Minister

Maps
Official Map of the Banaripara Upazila

References

Upazilas of Barisal District
Barishal Division